Around the World is a 1943 American comedy film produced and directed by Allan Dwan, from an original screenplay by Ralph Spence. RKO Radio Pictures premiered the film at the Globe Theater in New York on November 24, 1943. The film has a large cast, and stars Kay Kyser and his band, Mischa Auer, Joan Davis, Marcy McGuire, Wally Brown, and Alan Carney.

Plot
Kay Kyser, his band, and several entertainers begin a tour of overseas U.S. military forces. In Australia, the group is approached by a stranded American teen-ager, Marcy McGuire, who pleads with Kyser for him to take her with them when they leave. Kyser refuses, but this does not deter McGuire, who stows away on the group's plane heading for India. When she is discovered, the American authorities insist she be returned to Australia, but Kyser agrees to take responsibility for her.

Meanwhile, Kyser's entourage is infatuated with obtaining historical relics from the cultures they visit. When the group reaches their next stop, China, Auer procures a scarab ring which supposedly belonged to the Borgias, not realizing that the ring contains a secret Nazi document. While in China, Marcy becomes a performer in Kyser's band. As the Nazis now attempt to retrieve the document, the band moves on to Egypt. The Nazis attempt to obtain the ring, but are foiled again.

The group moves on to Tunisia, and finally Monrovia. In Monrovia, Marcy learns that her father, who was in the Army Air Corps, has been killed in action. Regardless of her new knowledge, Marcy manages to take the stage with her new colleagues.

Cast
(cast list as per AFI database)*

 Kay Kyser as himself
 Mischa Auer as himself
 Joan Davis as herself
 Marcy McGuire as herself
 Wally Brown as Pilot of the clipper
 Alan Carney as Joe Gimpus
 Kay Kyser's band as themselves
 Ish Kabibble as himself
 Georgia Carroll as herself
 Harry Babbitt as himself

Production
In April 1943, it was announced that Alan Dwan would be handling both the directing and producing responsibilities for the pictures. At the same time, Jimmy McHugh and Harald Adamson were selected to write the songs for the film, and Kay Kyser was cast as the lead. The working title of the film was Keep Em Singing. Mischa Auer, Joan Davis, and Marcy McGuire were added to the cast the following week, in early May. On May 14 it was announced that Barbara Hale, Rosemary LaPlanche, and Gloria Warren would be joining the cast, followed two weeks later by Patti Brilie and Margaret Landry. At the beginning of June Ivan Lebedeff was cast as Menlo, and Jadine Wong and Li Sun joined the cast in late June.

The film began production the last week of May 1943, and lasted through the first week in August. Originally scheduled to be shot at RKO Studios in Hollywood, due to scheduling conflicts the production was moved to the Pathe studios in Culver City. In July it was announced that selected members of the cast would preview the film for military personnel at 20 different military installations prior to the film's release to the general public. By early September, the footage of the film was being edited at the studio.

Two of the songs from the film, "Candlelight and Wine" and "Don't Believe Everything You Dream", were some of the most popular songs in the United States by the middle of November. Many of the performers in the film participated in a Thanksgiving morning performance for the troops on NBC radio. RKO originally scheduled a preview of the film for December 6, 1943 at their projection room on Ninth Avenue in New York City, but in late November moved the preview up to November 23. On November 22, it was announced that the film would be opening at the Globe Theater in New York on November 24, where it opened on schedule. Shortly after its opening, the National Legion of Decency rated the film as "unobjectionable for general patronage".

Reception
The Film Daily gave the film a mostly positive review, calling it a "... world of entertainment to offer those who relish lively rhythms." The New York Times''' Bosley Crowther did not think highly of the film, saying that the "... music, gags and slapstick designed to entertain our troops ..." was not of a high enough caliber to satisfy the discerning film viewer. He called the humor, as supplied by Auer and Davis, was "straight off the cob", and that the acting of Carroll and McGuire was shallow.  He specifically singled out his distaste for the performance of Kyser. Harrison's Reports called the film "moderately entertaining" with a meaningless story.Motion Picture Daily gave the film a positive review, saying it served "... up a sparkling concoction overflowing with small music and comedy." They applauded the work of Kyser, Auer, Davis, Brown and Carney. The Motion Picture Herald'' enjoyed the film, in spite of the lack of plot. They applauded the musical numbers and site gags, and highlighted the work of Kyser, Auer, Davis, Carney and Brown.

References

External links
 
 

1943 films
1943 comedy films
American comedy films
RKO Pictures films
World War II films made in wartime
Films directed by Allan Dwan
American black-and-white films
Films shot in Los Angeles County, California